Wainer is a surname. Notable people with the surname include:

 Alejandro Rojas Wainer (1945–2018), Chilean-Canadian academic
 Bertram Wainer (1928–1987), Australian physician
 Cherry Wainer (1935–2014), South African musician
 Howard Wainer (born 1943), American statistician and writer
 Samuel Wainer (1910–1980), Brazilian journalist and writer

See also
 Rachel Wainer Apter (born 1980/1981), New Jersey lawyer
 Wainer Lusoli (born 1974), Italian academic